Bulzești is a commune in Dolj County, Oltenia, Romania. It is composed of ten villages: Bulzești, Frățila, Gura Racului, Înfrățirea, Piscu Lung, Poienile, Prejoi, Săliște, Seculești and Stoicești.

References

Communes in Dolj County
Localities in Oltenia